Tetrasphaera japonica is a Gram-positive bacterium species from the genus Tetrasphaera which has been isolated from activated sludge from Japan.

References

External links 

Type strain of Tetrasphaera japonica at BacDive -  the Bacterial Diversity Metadatabase

Intrasporangiaceae
Bacteria described in 2000